Grimm Fairy Tales is a dark fantasy comic book series by Zenescope Entertainment that presents classic fairy tales, albeit with modern twists or expanded plots. It began publication in June 2005.

Summary
Each issue of Grimm Fairy Tales has two parts: a frame story and a fairy tale. The frame story revolves around Dr. Sela Mathers, a Professor of Literature with the supernatural ability to help people avoid bad life decisions by subjecting them to visions, in which they see themselves as the protagonists of allegorical fairy tales. As the series progresses, she struggles with the fact that several people ignore her lessons and ruin their lives anyway, and begins using her ability to dispense justice instead (see issue #15 "The Three Little Pigs"). Sela's nemesis is Belinda, who has the same ability as Sela but uses it for evil.

The other portion of the story is a twisted version of a classic fairy tale. The fairy tales are often violent and end in depressing ways, warning the readers to change their lives or suffer a similar (or sometimes worse) fate.

It is later revealed that Belinda is working for the Dark One, a Satan-like demon who is seeking to conquer not only Earth, but four other worlds which the fairy tales come from. The worlds include Wonderland, Oz, Neverland, and Myst. The series gradually begins to revolve around Sela herself, as she discovers that she has become a major player in an ancient war between the Dark Horde, led by the Dark One and his allies, and the Guardians, leaders of the worlds the Dark One seeks to conquer. Already Wonderland and Neverland have fallen and are now ruled by the Dark One's allies, the monstrous Jabberwocky and the soul-devouring immortal Pan, respectively.

After Volume 15 concludes, the beginning of a Zenescope comic event begins: "The Age of Darkness." It spans in every comic related to the Grimm Fairy Tales series. There are major tie-ins and things especially related to major worlds in Grimm Fairy Tales. These worlds are Oz, Myst, Neverland, Wonderland, and Earth. The event happened in 2013–2014 heading up to the 100th issue of Grimm Fairy Tales.

After the milestone issue, issues #101–125 are the "Arcane Acres" storyline.

Issues

Core series 

 Issue #13–14: Beauty and the Beast
 Issue #15: The Three Little Pigs
 Issue #16: Little Miss Muffet
 Issue #17: The Juniper Tree
 Issue #18: Three Billy Goats Gruff
 Issue #19: Rapunzel
 Issue #20: The Boy Who Cried Wolf
 Issue #21: The Sorcerer's Apprentice
 Issue #22: The Snow Queen
 Issue #23–24: Snow White and Rose Red
 Issue #25–26: The Little Mermaid
 Issue #27: Three Blind Mice
 Issue #28: The Ugly Duckling
 Issue #29: King Midas
 Issue #30: Rip Van Winkle
 Issue #31–32: Pinocchio
 Issue #33: Three Snake Leaves
 Issue #34: Puss In Boots
 Issue #35: Dorian Gray
 Issue #36: The Ugly Duckling II
 Issue #37: Little Miss Muffet II
 Issue #38: The Lion and the Mouse
 Issue #39: The Scorpion and the Frog
 Issue #40: The Goose and the Golden Egg
 Issue #41: Dante's Inferno [Prelude]
 Issue #42: Baba Yaga
 Issue #43: The Last Unicorn
 Issue #44: The Devil's Brother
 Issue #45: Cinderella [Revisited]
 Issue #46: Godfather Death
 Issue #47: The Devil's Gambit
 Issue #48: The Good Witch
 Issue #49: Myst
 Issue #50: Hard Choices
 Issue #51: The Glass Coffin
 Issue #52: The Golden Stag
 Issue #53: The Fairy and the Dwarf
 Issue #54: The Grateful Beasts
 Issue #55: The Goblin Queen
 Issue #56: Death's Key
 Issue #57: Diamonds and Toads
 Issue #58–62: Mother Nature
 Issue #63: Dream Eater Saga IX [9]
 Issue #64: Dream Eater Saga X [10]
 Issue #65: Jack the Giant Killer
 Issue #66: The Gates of Limbo
 Issue #67: Lost Souls
 Issue #68: The Immortals
 Issue #69: The Arena
 Issue #70: A Drink and a Tale
 Issue #71: The Winter Witch
 Issue #72: Curse of the Winter Witch
 Issue #73: Ghost in the Myst
 Issue #74: Winter's End
 Issue #75: The Return
 Issue #76–81: The Lockdown
 Issue #82: The Seal Skin
 Issue #83–84: Jack Frost
 Issue #85: Unleashed II
 Issue #86–87: The Phoenix
 Issue #88: The Dark Queen
 Issue #89–90: Rapunzel
 Issue #91: Shadow of Doubt
 Issue #92: Breaking Point
 Issue #93: Song of the Sword
 Issue #94: Is it Safe?
 Issue #95: Koschei the Deathless
 Issue #96: Fire and Ice
 Issue #97: The Tooth Fairy
 Issue #98: Leaves of Grass
 Issue #99: The Coming Storm
 Issue #100: Darkness Falls
 Issue #101: New Again
 Issue #102: The Lamp
 Issue #103: Snow White and Rose Red [Revisited]
 Issue #104–105: Rise of the Water Nymphs
 Issue #106: The Prophecy
 Issue #107–108: Burn Your Life Down
 Issue #109–110: Beowulf
 Issue #111: The Mad Hatter
 Issue #112: Bloody Bones
 Issue #113: War Is Over
 Issue #114: Death Breath
 Issue #115: The Sword in the Stone
 Issue #116–117: Something Wicked
 Issue #118: Grimm Furry Tales
 Issue #119: What the Gemini Saw
 Issue #120–121: The Shadow Girl
 Issue #122: Worst Behavior
 Issue #123: Eighteen Forever
 Issue #124: Eighteen Forever [Conclusion]
 Issue #125: Oh, the Places...

Relaunch series 
 Issue #1: A Wolf in Sheep's Clothing
 Issue #2: The Wrath of the Snow Queen
 Issue #3: The Last Genie
 Issue #4: The Princess and the Frog
 Issue #5: Neverland Pixies
 Issue #6: The Piper
 Issue #7: Snow White
 Issue #8: Gargoyles
 Issue #9: Genie of the Shadowlands
 Issue #10 Goldilocks
 Issue #11: Order of Tarot I
 Issue #12: Order of Tarot II
 Issue #13: Age of Camelot
 Issue #14: The Three Musketeers
Issue #15: The Black Knight
Issue #16: Sword of Camelot
Issue #17: Troll Under the Bridge I
Issue #18: Troll Under the Bridge II
Issue #19: Knights of the Round Table
Issue #20: Enter the Zodiac
Issue #21: Knights of the Round Table II
Issue #22: Lady of the Lake
Issue #23: The Fall of Camelot
Issue #24: Calm Before the Storm
Issue #25: War of the Grail
Issue #26: The Odyssey
Issue #27: Maze Run
Issue #28: Atlantis
Issue #29: The Emerald City
Issue #30: Land of Oz¿¿
Issue #31: SkarabsIssue #32: Return to NeverlandIssue #33: Tribes of NeverlandIssue #34: War of NeverlandIssue #35: WonderlandIssue #36: Swamp of MadnessIssue #37: Journey's EndIssue #38: The Dark BookIssue #39: What Lies WithinIssue #40: Forest of SecretsIssue #41: BearskinIssue #42: Baba Yaga Returns!Issue #43: A Girl and Her ShadowIssue #44: Children of FortuneIssue #45: The Handless MaidenIssue #46: Mother HuldaIssue #47: Nixie of Mill PondIssue #48: An Echo of WickednessIssue #49: False HeroIssue #50: A Dark ConclusionIssue #51: Fractured UniverseIssue #52: Cyberpunk'dIssue #53: The Spider Beside HerIssue #54: Caught in the WebIssue #55: Beasts of the City!Issue #56: A Pit in the Soul!Issue #57: Teeth, Claws and Bullets!Issue #58: On Death's DoorstepIssue #59: Steam-Powered & Blood FueledIssue #60: Gears Up at SunriseIssue #61: Doom. Spells. Disaster!Issue #62: Regicide!Issue #63: Waking HorrorsIssue #64: Deep Secrets!Issue #65: The Arcane Terror!Issue #66: Lurking UnderneathIssue #67: Esoteric BeliefsIssue #68: The AwakeningIssue #69: StarspawnIssue #70: Haunter of the DarkAnnuals and Specials

 2007 AnnualsGrimm Fairy Tales: 2007 AnnualStory Time I
 Jack and Jill The Old Woman in a Shoe Peter Peter Pumpkin Eater Little Boy Blue PinocchioStory Time II
 2008 AnnualsGrimm Fairy Tales: 2008 AnnualThe End of the Line Mary Mary Quite ContraryHumpty DumptyHush Little Baby 2009 Annuals
Grimm Fairy Tales: 2009 Giant-SizeFear Not Grimm Fairy Tales: 2009 April Fools' EditionRed Riding HoHansel and Gretel IIElectric BoogalooReeferstiltskinJack and the BromanceWonderland: 2009 Annual – The House of Liddle
Grimm Fairy Tales: 2009 Halloween EditionThe Monkey's PawGrimm Fairy Tales: 2009 Holiday EditionThe Nutcracker 2010 Annuals
 Grimm Fairy Tales: 2010 April Fools' EditionPiper Fluberblunton Goes to TownDrinking BeautyGolddigger and the BeastSnookie White and the Jersey DwarvesGrimm Fairy Tales: 2010 (Las Vegas) Annual
Grimm Fairy Tales: 2010 Swimsuit Edition
Grimm Fairy Tales: 2010 Halloween Edition
Wonderland: 2010 Annual
Grimm Fairy Tales: 2010 Holiday EditionComing to TownChristmas FutureThe PollyannaComing to Town [Conclusion]
 2011 Annuals
 Wonderland: 2011 Annual
Grimm Fairy Tales: 2011 AnnualSinbad Crossover #1
Grimm Fairy Tales: 2011 Giant-SizeSinbad Crossover #2
Grimm Fairy Tales: 2011 Halloween EditionDead Luck DesertThe Sure ThingRule of ThreeGrimm Fairy Tales: 2011 Holiday EditionA Christmas CarolGrimm Fairy Tales: 2011 Special EditionSinbad Crossover #3
 2012 Annuals 
Grimm Fairy Tales 2012 April Fools' EditionThe Sorcerer's Cleaning LadyStalker MermaidClarinda's Mom Has Got It Going OnPinocchio: One Creepy-Ass PuppetGrimm Fairy Tales: 2012 Annual
Grimm Fairy Tales: 2012 Oversized Cosplay Edition
Grimm Fairy Tales: 2012 Swimsuit Edition
Wonderland: 2012 Annual
Grimm Fairy Tales: 2012 Giant-Size
Grimm Fairy Tales: 2012 Halloween Edition
Grimm Fairy Tales: 2012 Animated Edition
Grimm Fairy Tales: 2012 Holiday Edition
 2013 Annuals
Grimm Fairy Tales: 2013 Valentine's Day Edition
Grimm Fairy Tales: 2013 St. Patrick's Day Edition
Grimm Fairy Tales: 2013 Wounded Warriors Edition
Grimm Fairy Tales: 2013 Giant-Size
Grimm Fairy Tales: 2013 Halloween Edition
Grimm Fairy Tales: 2013 Holiday Edition
 2014 Annuals
 Grimm Fairy Tales: 2014 Annual
Grimm Fairy Tales #0: 2014 Free Comic Book Day
Grimm Fairy Tales: 2014 Giant-Size
Grimm Fairy Tales: 2014 Swimsuit Edition
Grimm Fairy Tales: 2014 Halloween Edition
Grimm Fairy Tales: 2014 Holiday Edition
2015 Annuals
Wonderland: 2015 Special Edition [Free Comic Book Day]
Grimm Fairy Tales: 2015 Halloween Edition
Robyn Hood: 2015 Holiday Edition
Realm Knights: 2015 Annual
Realm Knights: 2015 Giant-Size
2016 Annuals
Robyn Hood: 2016 Annual
Grimm Fairy Tales: 2016 Swimsuit Edition
Grimm Fairy Tales: 2016 Annual
Grimm Fairy Tales: 2016 Halloween Edition
Grimm Fairy Tales: 2016 Photoshoot Edition
Grimm Tales of Terror: 2016 Holiday Edition
The Jungle Book: 2016 Holiday Edition
2017 Annuals
Grimm Tales of Terror: 2017 April Fools' Edition
Grimm Fairy Tales: 2017 Swimsuit Edition
Grimm Fairy Tales: 2017 Armed Forces Edition
Grimm Fairy Tales: 2017 Halloween Edition
Grimm Fairy Tales: 2017 Holiday Edition

 2018 Annuals
 Grimm Tales of Terror: 2018 Black & White Special Edition
 Grimm Fairy Tales: 2018 Cosplay Edition
 Grimm Tales of Terror: 2018 Halloween Edition
 Grimm Fairy Tales: 2018 Holiday Edition

 2019 Annuals
 Grimm Fairy Tales: 2019 Annual
 Grimm Universe Presents 2019
 Grimm Fairy Tales: 2019 Giant-Size
 Grimm Fairy Tales: 2019 Swimsuit Edition
 Grimm Fairy Tales: 2019 Armed Forces Edition
 Grimm Universe Presents: Fall 2019
 Grimm Fairy Tales: 2019 Horror Pinup Special
 Grimm Tales of Terror: 2019 Halloween Special
 Grimm Fairy Tales: 2019 Holiday Edition

 2020 Annuals
 Grimm Universe Presents 2020
 Grimm Fairy Tales: 2020 Annual
 Grimm Tales of Terror Quarterly: 2020 Halloween Special
 Grimm Fairy Tales: 2020 Holiday Pinup Special
 Grimm Fairy Tales: 2020 Holiday Special
 Cinderella Annual: Bloody X-Mas
 Robyn Hood Annual: World's Apart
 Van Helsing #50 Anniversary Issue
 Van Helsing: Annual 2020 Bloodlust

 2021 Annuals
 Grimm Fairy Tales: 2021 Swimsuit
 Neverland Annual
 Oz Annual: Patchwork Girl
 Robyn Hood Annual: The Swarm
 Wonderland Annual: Reign of Madness
 Grimm Tales of Terror Quarterly: 2021 Halloween Special
 Grimm Tales of Terror Annual: Goddess of Death
 Grimm Universe Presents Quarterly: 2021 Holiday Special

 2022 Annuals
 Belle #25 Annual
 Van Helsing Annual: Hour of the Witch
 Oz Annual: Dominion of Ozmo
 Grimm Fairy Tales 2022 May the 4th Cosplay Special
 Grimm Fairy Tales: 2022 Swimsuit Special
 Robyn Hoood Annual: Children of Darkness
 Grimm Fairy Tales: 2022 Annual
 Grimm Fairy Tales 2022 Horror Pinup Special
 Grimm Universe Presents Quarterly: 2022 Halloween Special
 Grimm Fairy Tales 2022 Holiday Pinup Special
 Belle Annual: Depths of Tartarus
 Grimm Tales of Terror Quarterly: 2022 Holiday Special

 2023 Annuals
 Wonderland Annual: A Wonderful Life
 Grimm Tales of Terror Quarterly: 2023 Valentine's Special
 Van Helsing Annual: Sins of the Father

Spin-offs and miniseries
Starting in May 2007, a Grimm Fairy Tales spin-off and limited series called Return to Wonderland debuted. Written by Raven Gregory, the series tells the tale of Alice Liddle, the heroine of Alice's Adventures in Wonderland, and her teenage daughter, Calie Liddle (an anagram of "Alice"). Alice is no longer the little girl who fell down the rabbit hole and discovered Wonderland. Now an adult, she once tried to commit suicide by slitting her wrists. Mentally disturbed and in a dreamlike state, her only link to reality is the disturbing white rabbit that she clings to. Calie, not wanting to deal with her mother's mental illness, is now a substance-abusing, alcoholic, promiscuous party girl. The series deals with the entire Liddle family, Alice's childhood, and Calie venturing into a darker and more frightening Wonderland than the one her mother knows. Confirmed characters for Return to Wonderland are the Queen of Hearts, the Mad Hatter, the Caterpillar, the Carpenter, the Walrus, Tweedledee, Tweedledum, the Cheshire Cat, the Jabberwocky, the March Hare, and the Cook.Tales From Wonderland, a three-part prequel to the Return to Wonderland series, was released in 2008, which included The Queen of Hearts, Alice, and The Mad Hatter, followed in June by #0 of Beyond Wonderland, the sequel to Return to Wonderland.Going Beyond Wonderland with Raven Gregory , Newsarama, April 11, 2008 The series returned for a third time in the summer of 2009 with another sequel Escape from Wonderland and Tales From Wonderland Series 2, which includes The Cheshire Cat, The Red Queen, Tweedledum and Tweedledee, and The Mad Hatter #2.

Zenescope has now released a 2009 Annual For Wonderland entitled "The House of Liddle", and continued the story of Calie in Beyond Wonderland, Escape From Wonderland, as well as an annual for 2010, 2011, 2012. Zenescope has begun publishing an ongoing Wonderland series in 2012, which revolved around Calie and her teenage daughter Violet. It concluded after issue 50.

Following the success of Wonderland comics Zenescope started several other series related to the GFT universe. Among them are Neverland, Oz, Robyn Hood and multiple mini-series such as Godstorm, Bad Girls and Sleepy Hollow.

Spin-offs

 Grimm Fairy Tales Myths and Legends [#1 – #25]Angel [One-shot]Grimm Universe [#1 – #5]Grimm Fairy Tales vs. Wonderland [#1 – #4]
 10th Anniversary Special [#1 – #6]Snow WhiteRed Riding HoodAlice in WonderlandDeathCinderellaVan Helsing Wonderland 
 Return to Wonderland [#0 – #6]Beyond Wonderland [#0 – #6]Escape From Wonderland [#0 – #6]
 Tales from Wonderland [10 Issues]

 Queen of Hearts The Mad Hatter Alice Cheshire Cat The Red Queen Tweedle Dee and Tweedle Dum The Mad Hatter II The White Knight The Red Rose Queen of Hearts vs. Mad Hatter Alice in Wonderland [#1 – #6]
 Call of Wonderland [#1– #4]
 Wonderland [#1 – #50]Wonderland Finale [One-shot]
 The Madness of Wonderland [#1 – #4]
 Wonderland: Down the Rabbit Hole [#1 – #5]Wonderland: Through the Looking Glass [#1 – #5]Wonderland: Asylum [#1 – #5]
 Clash of Queens [#1 – #5]Birth of Madness [One-shot]Revenge of Wonderland [#1 – #6]

 Neverland 
 Neverland [#0 – #7]
 Tales from Neverland [3 Issues]
 Tinker BelleTiger LilyCroc Neverland: Hook [#1 – #5]Return of Hook [One-shot]

 Robyn Hood Robyn Hood [#1 – #5]Robyn Hood vs. Red Riding Hood [One-shot]Wanted [#1 – #5]Legend [#1 – #5]Robyn Hood [#1 – #20]

 Riot Girls [#1 – #6]
 Monsters in the Dark [#7 – #12]
 Attitude Adjustment [#13 – #16]
 Uprising [#17 – #20]I Love NY [#1 – #12] (2016-2017) *TPB*Tarot   [One-shot] (2017)The Hunt   [#1 – #6] (2018) *TPB*Van Helsing vs. Robyn Hood   [1–4] *TPB*The Curse   [1-6] (2018) *TPB*Outlaw   [1–6] (2019)Justice  [1-6] (2020)Vigilante  [1-6] (2019-2020)Iron Maiden [1-2] (2021)Cult of the Spider-Queen [One-shot] (2021)Voodoo Dawn [One-shot] (2021)Goldilocks  [One-shot] (2021)Night of the Hunter [One-shot] (2021)Hellfire [One-shot] (2021)Home Sweet Home [One-shot] (2022)Shadows of the Past [One-shot] (2022)Hearts of Darkness [One-shot] (2022)Children of Dr. Moreau [One-shot] (2022)Baba Yaga [One-shot] (2022)Last Stop [One-shot] (2022)Dagon [One-shot] (2023)

 Oz 
 Oz [#1 – #6]Tales From Oz [6 Issues]

 Tin Man Cowardly Lion Scarecrow Glinda Adraste ZamoraWarlord of Oz [#1 – #6]Reign of the Witch Queen [#1 – #6]No Place Like Home [One-shot]The Wizard [One-shot]Heart of Magic [#1 – #5]Oz: Return of the Wicked Witch [#1 – #3]

 Van Helsing Helsing [#1 – #4]Van Helsing vs. Dracula [#1 – #5]Van Helsing vs. Frankenstein [#1 – #5]Van Helsing vs. The Mummy of Amun-Ra [#1 – #6]Van Helsing vs. The Werewolf [#1 – #6]Van Helsing vs. Robyn Hood [#1 – #4]Van Helsing: Sword of Heaven [#1 – #6]Van Helsing vs. Dracula's Daughter  [#1 - #5]Van Helsing vs. the League of Monsters  [#1 - #6]Van Helsing #50 [One-shot]Van Helsing: Hellfire [One-shot]Van Helsing: Black Annis [One-shot]Van Helsing: Steampunk [One-shot]Van Helsing: Invisible Woman [One-shot]Van Helsing: Beast of Exmoor [One-shot]Van Helsing: Return of the League of Monsters [#1 - #2]Van Helsing: Shattered Soul [One-shot]Van Helsing: Bloodborne [One-shot]Van Helsing: From the Depths [One-shot]Van Helsing: Flesh of My Blood [One-shot]Van Helsing: Rites of Shadows [One-shot]Van Helsing: Deadly Alchemy [One-shot]

 Belle Belle: Beast Hunter [#1 - #6]Belle: Oath of Thorns [#1 -#6]Belle vs. The Black Knight [One-shot]Belle: Ghosts & Goblins [One-shot]Belle: Hearts & Minds [One-shot]Belle: Horns of the Minotaur [One-shot]Belle: Targeted Prey [One-shot]Belle: Dead of Winter [One-shot]Belle: Thunder of Gods [One-shot]Belle: King of Serpents [One-shot]Belle: Sirens [One-shot]Belle: Dragon Clan [One-shot]Belle: Headless Horseman [One-shot]Belle: Kill Zone [One-shot]Belle: Queen of Serpents [One-shot]Belle: War of the Giants [One-shot]Belle: Labyrinth [One-shot]Belle: Return of Scylla [One-shot]Belle: Hunt of the Centaurs [One-shot]Belle: Deep Freeze [One-shot]Belle: Scream of the Banshee [One-shot]

 Miniseries The Piper [#1 – #4]Inferno [#1 – #5]

 Resurrection [#1 – #5]The Library [#1 – #5]The Jungle Book [#1 – #5]
 Last of the Species [#1 – #5]
 Fall of the Wild [#1 – #5]Bad Girls [#1 – #5]Godstorm [#0 – #4]
 Hercules Payne [#1 – #5]Sleepy Hollow [#1 – #4]No Tomorrow [#1 – #5]Goddess, Inc. [#1 – #5]Masumi: Blades of Sin [#1 – #4]Dark Shaman [#1 – #4]The Little Mermaid [#1 – #5]Coven [#1 – #5]Steampunk [#1 – #2]

 Steampunk: Alice In Wonderland [One-shot]Red Agent [#1 – #5]
 The Human Order [#1 – #9]
 Island of Dr. Moreau [#1 - #5]Hellchild [#1 – #5]
 The Unholy [#1 – #5]Inferno [One-shot]Hellchild: Blood Money [#1 – #4]Snow White vs. Snow White [#1 – #2]Grimm Fairy Tales: Apocalypse [#1 – #5]Genesis – Heroes Reborn [5 Stories, NOT issues]
 Van Helsing: Timeless Classic [One-shot]
 Robyn Hood: Auld Lang Syne [One-shot]
 Wonderland: Mad Dreams [One-shot]
 Death Force: Totems [One-shot]
 Grimm Fairy Tales: Judgment Rising [One-shot]Genesis: Heroes Rising [5 Stories, NOT issues]
 Red Agent: The Mission [One-shot]
 A Day of the Dead Tale [One-shot]
 Hellchild: Blood Money [One-shot]
 Oz: Birth of a Warlord [One-shot]
 Death [One-shot]

Death Force [#1 - #6]

Zodiac [#1 - #3]

Mystere [#1 - #5]

Day of the Dead [#1 – #6]

 Dance of The Dead [#1 – #6]

Grimm Fairy Tales: Tarot [#1 – #6]

The Musketeers [#1 – #5]

Jasmine: Crown of Kings [#1 – #5]The Black Knight [#1 – #5]

Gretel [#1 - #5]

Dragonsblood [#1 - #4]

Cinderella Serial Killer Princess [#1 - #4]

 Grimm Spotlight The Black Knight vs. Lord of the FliesMystere - Voodoo DawnHercules Payne vs. the Scorpion QueenRed Agent: Beast of BelgiumCinderella vs. ZombiesHellchildGretel: Bloody MaryMystere - DivinityZodiacIron MaidenCinderella vs. The Tooth FairyRed Agent: Friendly FireInferno - The Soul Collector Myths and Legends AresGretel Witch HunterDark PrincessDragon ClanBlood PharaohProphecyJack and JillJasmineWonderland - War of MadnessBlood of the Gods Grimm Universe Darkwatchers: GretelSteampunkZodiac vs Death ForceThe Black KnightDracula's DaughterSleeping BeautyCinderella - Fairy World Massacre Crossover The Dream Eater Saga [12 Issues]
 0. Prologue 1. Once Upon a Time 2. The Piper [One-shot]
 3. Myths and Legends #6
 4. Wonderland [One-shot]
 5. Neverland [One-shot]
 6. Salem's Daughter [One-shot]
 7. Myths and Legends #7
 8. Sinbad [One-shot]
 9. Grimm Fairy Tales #63
 10. Grimm Fairy Tales #64
 11. Inferno [One-shot]
 12. Ever After [Conclusion]Unleashed [6 Issues]
 0. The Game 1. Day Breaks 2. Grimm Fairy Tales #85
 3. Grimm Fairy Tales: 2013 Annual 4. Grimm Universe #5
 5. Grimm Fairy Tales: 2013 Special Edition 6. Grimm Fairy Tales: 2013 Giant-SizeUnleashed – Miniseries:
 Vampires: The Eternal [#1 – #3]
 Hunters: The Shadowlands [#1 – #5]
 Werewolves: The Hunger [#1 – #3]
 Demons: The Unseen [#1 – #3]
 Zombies: The Cursed [#1 – #4]Age of Darkness [Multiple Issues]
 Realm Knights [One-shot]
 Realm Knights [#1 – #4]
 Ascension [#1 – #5]
 Code Red [#1 – #5]
 Quest [#1 – #5]
 The Dark Queen: Age of Darkness [One-shot]
Grimm Fairy Tales #94 – #100
 Robyn Hood: Age of Darkness [One-shot]
 Neverland: Age of Darkness [#1 – #4]
 Inferno: Age of Darkness [One-shot]
 Rings of Hell [#1 – #3]
 The Dark One: Age of Darkness [One-shot]
 Oz: Age of Darkness [One-shot]
 Wonderland: Age of Darkness [One-shot]
 Godstorm: Age of Darkness [One-shot]
 Realm War: Age of Darkness [#1 – #12]
 Realm Knights: Age of Darkness [One-shot]
 Cinderella: Age of Darkness [#1 – #3]

 Other series 1001 Arabian Nights: The Adventures of Sinbad [#0 – #13]Salem's Daughter [#0 – #5]The Haunting [#1 – #5]Grimm Tales of Terror [#1 – #13]Grimm Tales of Terror, Vol. 2 [#1 – #13]Grimm Tales of Terror, Vol. 3 [#1 – #13]Grimm Tales of Terror, Vol. 4 [#1 – #13]Grimm Tales of Terror: The Bridgewater Triangle'' [#1 - #3]

Collections and trade paperbacks
The contents of a Grimm Fairy Tales comic collection can be defined into three categories: there are those issues that are "officially" reprinted in the collection (these issues have their original covers included in the cover gallery section), there are (parts of) issues from another series (these are included to induce the reader to buy that series), and there are bonus stories (original stories that were made specifically for the collection).

Grimm Fairy Tales V1 (Sela) (2005-2016)

Grimm Fairy Tales V2 (Skye) (2016-)

Wonderland

Robyn Hood

Chronological order

2005 
 2005/06 – Grimm Fairy Tales #1
 2005/11 – Grimm Fairy Tales #2
 2005/12 – Grimm Fairy Tales #3

2006 
 2006/01 – Grimm Fairy Tales #4
 2006/03 – Grimm Fairy Tales #5
 2006/05 – Grimm Fairy Tales #6
 2006/06 – Grimm Fairy Tales #7
 2006/07 – Grimm Fairy Tales #8
 2006/08 – Grimm Fairy Tales #9
 2006/09 – Grimm Fairy Tales #10
 2006/10 – Grimm Fairy Tales #11

2007 
 2007/02 – Grimm Fairy Tales #12
 2007/02 – Grimm Fairy Tales #13
 2007/04 – Grimm Fairy Tales #14
 2007/05 – Return to Wonderland #0 of 6
 2007/06 – Grimm Fairy Tales #15
 2007/07 – Return to Wonderland #1 of 6
 2007/07 – Return to Wonderland #2 of 6
 2007/08 – Grimm Fairy Tales #16
 2007/09 – Return to Wonderland #3 of 6
 2007/10 – Grimm Fairy Tales #17
 2007/10 – Grimm Fairy Tales: 2007 Annual
 2007/10 – Return to Wonderland #4 of 6
 2007/11 – Grimm Fairy Tales #18
 2007/11 – Grimm Fairy Tales #19
 2007/12 – Grimm Fairy Tales #20
 2007/12 – Return to Wonderland #5 of 6

2008 
 2008/01 – Grimm Fairy Tales #21
 2008/02 – Grimm Fairy Tales #22
 2008/02 – Return to Wonderland #6 of 6
 2008/03 – The Piper #1 of 4
 2008/03 – Grimm Fairy Tales #23
 2008/03 – Grimm Fairy Tales #24
 2008/04 – The Piper #2 of 4
 2008/04 – 1001 Arabian Nights: The Adventures of Sinbad #0
 2008/04 – Grimm Fairy Tales #25
 2008/04 – Grimm Fairy Tales #26
 2008/04 – Tales from Wonderland: Queen of Hearts
 2008/05 – 1001 Arabian Nights: The Adventures of Sinbad #1
 2008/05 – Beyond Wonderland #0 of 6
 2008/05 – Grimm Fairy Tales #27
 2008/05 – Tales from Wonderland: The Mad Hatter
 2008/06 – The Piper #3 of 4
 2008/06 – Grimm Fairy Tales #28
 2008/06 – Tales from Wonderland: Alice
 2008/07 – Beyond Wonderland #1 of 6
 2008/07 – The Piper #4 of 4
 2008/07 – Grimm Fairy Tales #29
 2008/07 – 1001 Arabian Nights: The Adventures of Sinbad #2
 2008/08 – Grimm Fairy Tales #30
 2008/08 – 1001 Arabian Nights: The Adventures of Sinbad #3
 2008/09 – Beyond Wonderland #2 of 6
 2008/10 – Beyond Wonderland #3 of 6
 2008/10 – Grimm Fairy Tales #31
 2008/11 – 1001 Arabian Nights: The Adventures of Sinbad #4
 2008/11 – Grimm Fairy Tales #32
 2008/11 – 1001 Arabian Nights: The Adventures of Sinbad #5
 2008/12 – Grimm Fairy Tales #33
 2008/12 – 1001 Arabian Nights: The Adventures of Sinbad #6
 2008/12 – Grimm Fairy Tales: 2008 Annual

2009 
 2009/01 – 1001 Arabian Nights: The Adventures of Sinbad #7
 2009/01 – Grimm Fairy Tales #34
 2009/01 – Grimm Fairy Tales: 2009 Giant-Size
 2009/01 – 1001 Arabian Nights: The Adventures of Sinbad #8
 2009/02 – Beyond Wonderland #4 of 6
 2009/02 – Grimm Fairy Tales #35
 2009/02 – Grimm Fairy Tales #36
 2009/03 – Beyond Wonderland #5 of 6
 2009/04 – 1001 Arabian Nights: The Adventures of Sinbad #9
 2009/04 – Beyond Wonderland #6 of 6
 2009/04 – Grimm Fairy Tales #37
 2009/04 – Grimm Fairy Tales: 2009 April Fool's Edition
 2009/04 – Salem's Daughter #0 of 5
 2009/05 – Grimm Fairy Tales #38
 2009/05 – Wonderland: 2009 Annual – The House of Liddle
 2009/06 – Escape From Wonderland #0 of 6
 2009/06 – Grimm Fairy Tales #39
 2009/06 – Tales from Wonderland: The Cheshire Cat
 2009/06 – Salem's Daughter #1 of 5
 2009/06 – Tales from Wonderland: The Red Queen
 2009/07 – Escape From Wonderland #1 of 6
 2009/07 – Grimm Fairy Tales #40
 2009/08 – Grimm Fairy Tales #41
 2009/09 – Tales from Wonderland: Tweedle Dee and Tweedle Dum
 2009/10 – Salem's Daughter #2 of 5
 2009/10 – Escape From Wonderland #2 of 6
 2009/10 – Grimm Fairy Tales #42
 2009/10 – Grimm Fairy Tales: 2009 Halloween Special
 2009/10 – Tales from Wonderland: The Mad Hatter II
 2009/10 – 1001 Arabian Nights: The Adventures of Sinbad #10
 2009/12 – Escape From Wonderland #3 of 6
 2009/12 – Grimm Fairy Tales #43
 2009/12 – Grimm Fairy Tales: 2009 Holiday Edition

2010 
 2010/01 – Escape From Wonderland #4 of 6
 2010/01 – Neverland #0 of 7
 2010/02 – Grimm Fairy Tales #44
 2010/02 – Salem's Daughter #3 of 5
 2010/03 – Escape From Wonderland #5 of 6
 2010/03 – Grimm Fairy Tales #45
 2010/03 – Neverland #1 of 7
 2010/04 – Escape From Wonderland #6 of 6
 2010/04 – Grimm Fairy Tales #46
 2010/04 – Salem's Daughter #4 of 5
 2010/04 – Grimm Fairy Tales: 2010 April Fool's Edition
 2010/04 – Neverland #2 of 7
 2010/05 – Inferno #1 of 5
 2010/05 – Grimm Fairy Tales: 2010 (Las Vegas) Annual
 2010/05 – Grimm Fairy Tales #47
 2010/05 – Tales from Wonderland: The White Knight
 2010/06 – Grimm Fairy Tales #48
 2010/06 – Neverland #3 of 7
 2010/07 – Inferno #2 of 5
 2010/07 – Grimm Fairy Tales: 2010 Swimsuit Special
 2010/07 – Grimm Fairy Tales #49
 2010/07 – 1001 Arabian Nights: The Adventures of Sinbad #11
 2010/07 – Neverland #4 of 7
 2010/07 – Tales from Wonderland: The Red Rose
 2010/08 – Inferno #3 of 5
 2010/08 – 1001 Arabian Nights: The Adventures of Sinbad #12
 2010/08 – Salem's Daughter #5 of 5
 2010/08 – Tales from Wonderland: Queen of Hearts vs. Mad Hatter
 2010/09 – Grimm Fairy Tales #50
 2010/09 – Grimm Fairy Tales #51
 2010/09 – Inferno #4 of 5
 2010/09 – Neverland #5 of 7
 2010/10 – Grimm Fairy Tales #52
 2010/10 – Grimm Fairy Tales: 2010 Halloween Special
 2010/10 – 1001 Arabian Nights: The Adventures of Sinbad #13
 2010/11 – Grimm Fairy Tales #53
 2010/11 – Wonderland: 2010 Annual
 2010/12 – Inferno #5 of 5
 2010/12 – Grimm Fairy Tales #54
 2010/12 – Grimm Fairy Tales: 2010 Holiday Edition
 2010/12 – Neverland #6 of 7

2011 
 2011/01 – Myths & Legends #1
 2011/02 – Grimm Fairy Tales #55
 2011/02 – Neverland #7 of 7
 2011/03 – Grimm Fairy Tales #56
 2011/03 – Grimm Fairy Tales #57
 2011/03 – Myths & Legends #2
 2011/03 – Myths & Legends #3
 2011/04 – Grimm Fairy Tales #58
 2011/04 – Myths & Legends #4
 2011/04 – The Dream Eater Saga #0 of 12: Prelude
 2011/05 – Tales from Neverland: Tinker Belle
 2011/05 – Grimm Fairy Tales #59
 2011/05 – The Dream Eater Saga #1 of 12: Once Upon a Time
 2011/06 – Grimm Fairy Tales #60
 2011/06 – Wonderland: 2011 Annual
 2011/06 – Myths & Legends #5
 2011/06 – The Dream Eater Saga #2 of 12: The Piper [One-shot]
 2011/06 – Myths & Legends #6: The Dream Eater Saga #3 of 12
 2011/06 – The Dream Eater Saga #4 of 12: Wonderland [One-shot]
 2011/06 – The Dream Eater Saga #5 of 12: Neverland [One-shot]
 2011/07 – Tales from Neverland: Tiger Lily
 2011/07 – Grimm Fairy Tales #61
 2011/07 – Grimm Fairy Tales #62
 2011/07 – The Dream Eater Saga #6 of 12: Salem's Daughter [One-shot]
 2011/07 – Myths & Legends #7: The Dream Eater Saga #7 of 12
 2011/08 – Tales from Neverland: Croc
 2011/08 – The Dream Eater Saga #8 of 12: Sinbad [One-shot]
 2011/08 – Salem's Daughter: The Haunting #1 of 5
 2011/08 – Grimm Fairy Tales #63: The Dream Eater Saga #9 of 12
 2011/09 – The Library #1 of 5
 2011/09 – Grimm Fairy Tales #64: The Dream Eater Saga #10 of 12
 2011/09 – Grimm Fairy Tales: 2011 Annual – Sinbad Crossover #1 of 3
 2011/09 – Salem's Daughter: The Haunting #2 of 5
 2011/09 – The Dream Eater Saga #11 of 12: Inferno [One-shot]
 2011/10 – The Library #2 of 5
 2011/10 – Grimm Fairy Tales: 2011 Giant-Size – Sinbad Crossover #2 of 3
 2011/10 – Grimm Fairy Tales: 2011 Halloween Special
 2011/10 – Myths & Legends #8
 2011/10 – The Dream Eater Saga #12 of 12: Ever After [Conclusion]
 2011/11 – Grimm Fairy Tales #65
 2011/11 – Myths & Legends #9
 2011/11 – Neverland: Hook #1 of 5
 2011/11 – Salem's Daughter: The Haunting #3 of 5
 2011/11 – Neverland: Hook #2 of 5
 2011/12 – The Library #3 of 5
 2011/12 – Grimm Fairy Tales #66
 2011/12 – Grimm Fairy Tales: 2011 Holiday Edition
 2011/12 – Salem's Daughter: The Haunting #4 of 5
 2011/12 – Grimm Fairy Tales: 2011 Special Edition – Sinbad Crossover #3 of 3
 2011/12 – Myths & Legends #10

2012 
 2012/01 – Alice in Wonderland #1 of 6
 2012/01 – Myths & Legends #11
 2012/02 – Alice in Wonderland #2 of 6
 2012/02 – The Library #4 of 5
 2012/02 – Grimm Fairy Tales #67
 2012/02 – Myths & Legends #12
 2012/02 – Myths & Legends #13
 2012/02 – Neverland: Hook #3 of 5
 2012/03 – Alice in Wonderland #3 of 6
 2012/03 – Grimm Fairy Tales #68
 2012/03 – Salem's Daughter: The Haunting #5 of 5
 2012/03 – Grimm Fairy Tales #69
 2012/03 – Grimm Fairy Tales #70
 2012/03 – Myths & Legends #14
 2012/03 – Neverland: Hook #4 of 5
 2012/03 – The Jungle Book #1 of 5
 2012/04 – Alice in Wonderland #4 of 6
 2012/04 – Alice in Wonderland #5 of 6
 2012/04 – The Library #5 of 5
 2012/04 – Grimm Fairy Tales #71
 2012/04 – Grimm Fairy Tales #72
 2012/04 – Grimm Fairy Tales: 2012 April Fool's Edition
 2012/04 – Myths & Legends #15
 2012/04 – The Jungle Book #2 of 5
 2012/05 – Alice in Wonderland #6 of 6
 2012/05 – Call of Wonderland #1 of 4
 2012/05 – Grimm Fairy Tales #73
 2012/05 – Myths & Legends #16
 2012/05 – Myths & Legends #17
 2012/05 – Neverland: Hook #5 of 5
 2012/05 – The Jungle Book #3 of 5
 2012/06 – Grimm Fairy Tales: Angel [One-shot]
 2012/06 – Grimm Fairy Tales #74
 2012/06 – Grimm Fairy Tales: 2012 Annual
 2012/06 – Grimm Fairy Tales: Oversized Cosplay Special
 2012/07 – Call of Wonderland #2 of 4
 2012/07 – Bad Girls #1 of 5
 2012/07 – Grimm Fairy Tales #75
 2012/07 – Grimm Fairy Tales: 2012 Swimsuit Special
 2012/07 – The Jungle Book #4 of 5
 2012/07 – Myths & Legends #18
 2012/07 – Wonderland: 2012 Annual
 2012/07 – Wonderland #1
 2012/08 – Call of Wonderland #3 of 4
 2012/08 – Myths & Legends #19
 2012/09 – Bad Girls #2 of 5
 2012/09 – Call of Wonderland #4 of 4
 2012/09 – Godstorm #0 of 4
 2012/09 – Grimm Fairy Tales #76
 2012/09 – Grimm Fairy Tales #77
 2012/09 – The Jungle Book #5 of 5
 2012/09 – Myths & Legends #20
 2012/09 – Wonderland #2
 2012/09 – Wonderland #3
 2012/10 – Bad Girls #3 of 5
 2012/10 – Godstorm #1 of 4
 2012/10 – Grimm Fairy Tales #78
 2012/10 – Grimm Fairy Tales: 2012 Giant-Size
 2012/10 – Grimm Fairy Tales: 2012 Halloween Special
 2012/10 – Grimm Universe #1 of 5
 2012/10 – Myths & Legends #21
 2012/10 – Myths & Legends #22
 2012/10 – Robyn Hood #1 of 5
 2012/10 – Robyn Hood #2 of 5
 2012/10 – Sleepy Hollow #1 of 4
 2012/10 – Wonderland #4
 2012/11 – Bad Girls #4 of 5
 2012/11 – Godstorm #2 of 4
 2012/11 – Grimm Fairy Tales #79
 2012/11 – Myths & Legends #23
 2012/11 – Robyn Hood #3 of 5
 2012/11 – Sleepy Hollow #2 of 4
 2012/11 – Wonderland #5
 2012/12 – Bad Girls #5 of 5
 2012/12 – Godstorm #3 of 4
 2012/12 – Grimm Fairy Tales #80
 2012/12 – Grimm Fairy Tales: 2012 Holiday Edition
 2012/12 – Robyn Hood #4 of 5
 2012/12 – Wonderland #6

2013 
 2013/01 – Grimm Fairy Tales #81
 2013/01 – Grimm Universe #2 of 5
 2013/01 – Myths & Legends #24
 2013/01 – Sleepy Hollow #3 of 4
 2013/01 – Sleepy Hollow #4 of 4
 2013/01 – Wonderland #7
 2013/02 – Godstorm #4 of 4
 2013/02 – Grimm Fairy Tales #82
 2013/02 – Grimm Fairy Tales: 2013 Valentine's Day Special
 2013/02 – Grimm Universe #3 of 5
 2013/02 – Myths & Legends #25
 2013/02 – Robyn Hood #5 of 5
 2013/02 – Wonderland #8
 2013/02 – The Madness of Wonderland #1 of 4
 2013/02 – The Jungle Book: Last of the Species #1 of 5
 2013/03 – Robyn Hood vs. Red Riding Hood [One-shot]
 2013/03 – Grimm Fairy Tales #83
 2013/03 – The Jungle Book: Last of the Species #2 of 5
 2013/03 – The Madness of Wonderland #2 of 4
 2013/03 – Grimm Universe #4 of 5
 2103/03 – Grimm Fairy Tales: 2013 St. Patrick's Day Special
 2013/03 – Wonderland #9
 2013/04 – Unleashed #0 of 6: The Game
 2013/04 – Unleashed #1 of 6: Day Breaks
 2013/04 – Wonderland #10
 2013/04 – The Madness of Wonderland #3 of 4
 2013/04 – Grimm Fairy Tales #84
 2013/04 – Vampires: The Eternal #1 of 3 [Unleashed Tie-in]
 2013/04 – The Jungle Book: Last of the Species #3 of 5
 2013/05 – Hunters: The Shadowlands #1 of 5 [Unleashed Tie-in]
 2013/05 – Robyn Hood: Wanted #1 of 5
 2013/05 – Vampires: The Eternal #2 of 3 [Unleashed Tie-in]
 2013/05 – The Madness of Wonderland #4 of 4
 2013/05 – Wonderland: Down the Rabbit Hole #1 of 5
 2013/05 – Werewolves: The Hunger #1 of 3 [Unleashed Tie-in]
 2013/05 – Grimm Fairy Tales #85: Unleashed #2 of 6
 2013/05 – Wonderland #11
 2013/05 – Realm Knights [One-shot]
 2013/06 – Robyn Hood: Wanted #2 of 5
 2013/06 – Wonderland: Down the Rabbit Hole #2 of 5
 2013/06 – Demons: The Unseen #1 of 3 [Unleashed Tie-in]
 2013/06 – The Jungle Book: Last of the Species #4 of 5
 2013/06 – Grimm Fairy Tales #86
 2013/06 – Vampires: The Eternal #3 of 3 [Unleashed Tie-in]
 2013/06 – Grimm Fairy Tales: 2013 Annual: Unleashed #3 of 6
 2013/06 – Hunters: The Shadowlands #2 of 5 [Unleashed Tie-in]
 2013/06 – Wonderland #12
 2013/07 – Oz #1 of 6
 2013/07 – Grimm Universe #5 of 5: Unleashed #4 of 6
 2013/07 – Grimm Fairy Tales #87
 2013/07 – Grimm Fairy Tales: Wounded Warriors Special
 2013/07 – Zombies: The Cursed #1 of 3 [Unleashed Tie-in]
 2013/07 – Demons: The Unseen #2 of 3 [Unleashed Tie-in]
 2013/07 – The Jungle Book: Last of the Species #5 of 5
 2013/07 – Hunters: The Shadowlands #3 of 5 [Unleashed Tie-in]
 2013/07 – Robyn Hood: Wanted #3 of 5
 2013/07 – Werewolves: The Hunger #2 of 3 [Unleashed Tie-in]
 2013/08 – Wonderland: Down the Rabbit Hole #3 of 5
 2013/08 – Werewolves: The Hunger #3 of 3 [Unleashed Tie-in]
 2013/08 – Zombies: The Cursed #2 of 3 [Unleashed Tie-in]
 2013/08 – Demons: The Unseen #3 of 3 [Unleashed Tie-in]
 2013/08 – Wonderland #13
 2013/08 – Grimm Fairy Tales #88
 2013/08 – Realm Knights #1 of 4
 2013/08 – Oz #2 of 6
 2013/08 – No Tomorrow #1 of 5
 2013/08 – Grimm Fairy Tales: 2013 Special Edition: Unleashed #5
 2013/08 – Robyn Hood: Wanted #4 of 5
 2013/09 – Hunters: The Shadowlands #4 of 5 [Unleashed Tie-in]
 2013/09 – Wonderland: Down the Rabbit Hole #4 of 5
 2013/09 – Grimm Fairy Tales #89
 2013/09 – Wonderland #14
 2013/09 – Zombies: The Cursed #3 of 3 [Unleashed Tie-in]
 2013/09 – Wonderland #15
 2013/09 – Realm Knights #2 of 4
 2013/09 – No Tomorrow #2 of 5
 2013/10 – Wonderland: Down the Rabbit Hole #5 of 5
 2013/10 – Wonderland: Through the Looking Glass #1 of 5
 2013/10 – Grimm Fairy Tales: Giant-Sized Special: Unleashed #6 of 6
 2013/10 – Grimm Fairy Tales: 2013 Halloween Special
 2013/10 – Hunters: The Shadowlands #5 of 5 [Unleashed Tie-in]
 2013/10 – Oz #3 of 6
 2013/10 – Robyn Hood: Wanted #5 of 5
 2013/10 – Wonderland #16
 2013/10 – No Tomorrow #3 of 5
 2013/10 – Wonderland: Through the Looking Glass #2 of 5
 2013/10 – Grimm Fairy Tales #90
 2013/10 – Realm Knights #3 of 4
 2013/11 – Oz #4 of 6
 2013/11 – Grimm Fairy Tales #91
 2013/11 – Wonderland #17
 2013/11 – Wonderland: Through the Looking Glass #3 of 5
 2013/11 – Quest #1 of 5
 2013/12 – Realm Knights #4 of 4
 2013/12 – Wonderland #18
 2013/12 – Grimm Fairy Tales: 2013 Holiday Edition
 2013/12 – No Tomorrow #4 of 5
 2013/12 – Code Red #1 of 5
 2013/12 – Wonderland: Through the Looking Glass #4 of 5
 2013/12 – Oz #5 of 6
 2013/12 – Quest #2 of 5
 2013/12 – Grimm Fairy Tales #92

2014 

 2014/01 – Wonderland: Through the Looking Glass #5 of 5
 2014/01 – Wonderland #19
 2014/01 – No Tomorrow #5 of 5
 2014/01 – The Dark Queen: Age of Darkness [One-shot]
 2014/01 – Quest #3 of 5
 2014/01 – Wonderland: Asylum #1 of 5
 2014/01 – Grimm Fairy Tales #93
 2014/01 – Code Red #2 of 5
 2014/01 – Tales from Oz: Tin Man
 2014/02 – Ascension #1 of 5
 2014/02 – Oz #6 of 6
 2014/02 – Code Red #3 of 5
 2014/02 – Robyn Hood: Age of Darkness [One-shot]
 2014/02 – Wonderland: Clash of Queens #1 of 5
 2014/02 – Wonderland #20
 2014/02 – Wonderland: Asylum #2 of 5
 2014/02 – Tales from Oz: Cowardly Lion
 2014/02 – Grimm Fairy Tales #94
 2014/02 – Quest #4 of 5
 2014/03 – Tales from Oz: Scarecrow
 2014/03 – Code Red #4 of 5
 2014/03 – Grimm Fairy Tales #95
 2014/03 – Ascension #2 of 5
 2014/03 – Neverland: Age of Darkness #1 of 4
 2014/03 – Wonderland: Asylum #3 of 5
 2014/03 – Wonderland #21
 2014/03 – Robyn Hood: Legend #1 of 5
 2014/03 – Wonderland: Clash of Queens #2 of 5
 2014/03 – Quest #5 of 5
 2014/04 – Grimm Fairy Tales #96
 2014/04 – Ascension #3 of 5
 2014/04 – Robyn Hood: Legend #2 of 5
 2014/04 – Neverland: Age of Darkness #2 of 4
 2014/04 – Inferno: Age of Darkness [One-shot]
 2014/04 – Godstorm: Hercules Payne #1 of 5
 2014/04 – Wonderland #22
 2014/04 – Helsing #1 of 4
 2014/04 – Code Red #5 of 5
 2014/04 – Wonderland: Clash of Queens #3 of 5
 2014/04 – Wonderland: Asylum #4 of 5
 2014/05 – Warlord of Oz #1 of 6
 2014/05 – The Dark One: Age of Darkness [One-shot]
 2014/05 – Grimm Fairy Tales #97
 2014/05 – Ascension #4 of 5
 2014/05 – Neverland: Age of Darkness #3 of 4
 2014/05 – Wonderland: Clash of Queens #4 of 5
 2014/05 – Wonderland: Asylum #5 of 5
 2014/05 – Wonderland #23
 2014/05 – Robyn Hood: Legend #3 of 5
 2014/05 – Grimm Fairy Tales: 2014 Annual
 2014/05 – Helsing #2 of 4
 2014/05 – Grimm Fairy Tales #0 [Free Comic Book Day]
 2014/05 – Godstorm: Hercules Payne #2 of 5
 2014/06 – Grimm Fairy Tales #98
 2014/06 – Ascension #5 of 5
 2014/06 – Neverland: Age of Darkness #4 of 4
 2014/06 – Wonderland: Clash of Queens #5 of 5
 2014/06 – Wonderland #24
 2014/06 – Helsing #3 of 4
 2014/06 – Oz: Age of Darkness [One-shot]
 2014/06 – Wonderland: Age of Darkness [One-shot]
 2014/06 – Godstorm: Age of Darkness [One-shot]
 2014/06 – Robyn Hood: Legend #4 of 5
 2014/06 – Warlord of Oz #2 of 6
 2014/06 – Godstorm: Hercules Payne #3 of 5
 2014/07 – Grimm Fairy Tales #99
 2014/07 – Grimm Fairy Tales #100
 2014/07 – Grimm Fairy Tales: 2014 Giant-Sized
 2014/07 – Realm War: Age of Darkness #1 of 12
 2014/07 – Wonderland #25
 2014/07 – Helsing #4 of 4
 2014/07 – Realm Knight: Age of Darkness [One-shot]
 2014/07 – Robyn Hood: Legend #5 of 5
 2014/07 – Warlord of Oz #3 of 6
 2014/07 – Grimm Tales of Terror #1 of 13
 2014/07 – Grimm Fairy Tales vs. Wonderland #1 of 4
 2014/07 – Godstorm: Hercules Payne #4 of 5
 2014/07 – Grimm Fairy Tales: 2014 Swimsuit Special
 2014/08 – Goddess, Inc. #1 of 5
 2014/08 – Masumi: Blades of Sin #1 of 4
 2014/08 – Inferno: Rings of Hell #1 of 3
 2014/08 – Wonderland #26
 2014/08 – Grimm Fairy Tales vs. Wonderland #2 of 4
 2014/08 – Grimm Fairy Tales #101
 2014/08 – Robyn Hood #1
 2014/08 – Realm War: Age of Darkness #2 of 12
 2014/08 – Warlord of Oz #4 of 6
 2014/08 – Godstorm: Hercules Payne #5 of 5
 2014/09 – Grimm Tales of Terror #2 of 13
 2014/09 – Goddess, Inc. #2 of 5
 2014/09 – Inferno: Rings of Hell #2 of 3
 2014/09 – Grimm Fairy Tales #102
 2014/09 – Wonderland #27
 2014/09 – Grimm Fairy Tales vs. Wonderland #3 of 4
 2014/09 – Grimm Tales of Terror #3 of 13
 2014/09 – Robyn Hood #2
 2014/09 – Realm War: Age of Darkness #3 of 12
 2014/09 – Warlord of Oz #5 of 6
 2014/09 – Masumi: Blades of Sin #2 of 4
 2014/10 – Grimm Fairy Tales: 2014 Halloween Special
 2014/10 – Masumi: Blades of Sin #3 of 4
 2014/10 – Grimm Tales of Terror #4 of 13
 2014/10 – Wonderland #28
 2014/10 – Goddess, Inc. #3 of 5
 2014/10 – Grimm Fairy Tales #103
 2014/10 – Grimm Fairy Tales vs. Wonderland #4 of 4
 2014/10 – Dark Shaman #1 of 4
 2014/10 – Inferno: Rings of Hell #3 of 3
 2014/10 – Robyn Hood #3
 2014/10 – Warlord of Oz #6 of 6
 2014/10 – Realm War: Age of Darkness #4 of 12
 2014/11 – Cinderella: Age of Darkness #1 of 3
 2014/11 – Masumi: Blades of Sin #4 of 4
 2014/11 – Goddess, Inc. #4 of 5
 2014/11 – Grimm Fairy Tales #104
 2014/11 – Grimm Fairy Tales: 2014 Holiday Edition
 2014/11 – Dark Shaman #2 of 4
 2014/11 – Robyn Hood #4
 2014/11 – Wonderland #29
 2014/11 – Tales from Oz: Glinda
 2014/12 – Grimm Tales of Terror #5 of 13
 2014/12 – Realm War: Age of Darkness #5 of 12
 2014/12 – Grimm Fairy Tales #105
 2014/12 – Goddess, Inc. #5 of 5
 2014/12 – Cinderella: Age of Darkness #2 of 3
 2014/12 – Tales from Oz: Adraste
 2014/12 – The Jungle Book: Fall of the Wild #1 of 5
 2014/12 – Robyn Hood #5
 2014/12 – Dark Shaman #3 of 4
 2014/12 – Wonderland #30

2015 
 2015/01 – Grimm Tales of Terror #6 of 13
 2015/01 – Grimm Fairy Tales #106
 2015/01 – Wonderland #31
 2015/01 – Cinderella: Age of Darkness #3 of 3
 2015/01 – Tales from Oz: Zamora
 2015/01 – Realm War: Age of Darkness #6 of 12
 2015/01 – Dark Shaman #4 of 4
 2015/01 – The Jungle Book: Fall of the Wild #2 of 5
 2015/01 – Robyn Hood #6
 2015/02 – Grimm Fairy Tales #107
 2015/02 – White Queen: Age of Darkness #1 of 3
 2015/02 – Grimm Tales of Terror #7 of 13
 2015/02 – Wonderland #32
 2015/02 – Realm War: Age of Darkness #7 of 12
 2015/02 – Grimm Tales of Terror #8 of 13
 2015/02 – Robyn Hood #7
 2015/02 – The Jungle Book: Fall of the Wild #3 of 5
 2015/02 – The Little Mermaid #1 of 5
 2015/03 – Grimm Fairy Tales #108
 2015/03 – White Queen: Age of Darkness #2 of 3
 2015/03 – Robyn Hood #8
 2015/03 – The Little Mermaid #2 of 5
 2015/03 – Wonderland #33
 2015/03 – Realm War: Age of Darkness #8 of 12
 2015/03 – Grimm Tales of Terror #9 of 13
 2015/04 – Robyn Hood #9
 2015/04 – White Queen: Age of Darkness #3 of 3
 2015/04 – The Jungle Book: Fall of the Wild #4 of 5
 2015/04 – Grimm Fairy Tales #109
 2015/04 – Grimm Tales of Terror #10 of 13
 2015/04 – Wonderland #34
 2015/04 – The Little Mermaid #3 of 5
 2015/04 – Wonderland: 2015 Special Edition [Free Comic Book Day]
 2015/05 – Grimm Fairy Tales #110
 2015/05 – Robyn Hood #10
 2015/05 – Oz: Reign of the Witch Queen #1 of 6
 2015/05 – The Jungle Book: Fall of the Wild #5 of 5
 2015/05 – Realm War: Age of Darkness #9 of 12
 2015/05 – The Little Mermaid #4 of 5
 2015/05 – Wonderland #35
 2015/05 – Grimm Tales of Terror #11 of 13
 2015/05 – Snow White: 10th Anniversary Special #1
 2015/06 – Grimm Fairy Tales #111
 2015/06 – Robyn Hood #11
 2015/06 – The Little Mermaid #5 of 5
 2015/06 – Wonderland #36
 2015/06 – Realm War: Age of Darkness #10 of 12
 2015/06 – Oz: Reign of the Witch Queen #2 of 6
 2015/06 – Red Riding Hood: 10th Anniversary Special #2
 2015/07 – Grimm Fairy Tales #112
 2015/07 – Robyn Hood #12
 2015/07 – Wonderland #37
 2015/07 – Grimm Tales of Terror #12 of 13
 2015/07 – Grimm Tales of Terror #13 of 13
 2015/07 – Oz: Reign of the Witch Queen #3 of 6
 2015/07 – Coven #1 of 5
 2015/07 – Alice in Wonderland: 10th Anniversary Special #3
 2015/08 – Grimm Fairy Tales #113
 2015/08 – Robyn Hood #13
 2015/08 – Wonderland #38
 2015/08 – Realm War: Age of Darkness #11 of 12
 2015/08 – Oz: Reign of the Witch Queen #4 of 6
 2015/08 – Coven #2 of 5
 2015/08 – Van Helsing vs. Dracula #1 of 5
 2015/09 – Grimm Fairy Tales #114
 2015/09 – Robyn Hood #14
 2015/09 – Wonderland #39
 2015/09 – Coven #3 of 5
 2015/09 – Van Helsing vs. Dracula #2 of 5
 2015/09 – Death: 10th Anniversary Special #4
 2015/09 – Grimm Fairy Tales: 2015 Halloween Special
 2015/10 – Oz: Reign of the Witch Queen #5 of 6
 2015/10 – Cinderella: 10th Anniversary Special #5
 2015/10 – Realm War: Age of Darkness #12 of 12
 2015/10 – Wonderland #40
 2015/10 – Van Helsing vs. Dracula #3 of 5
 2015/10 – Grimm Fairy Tales #115
 2015/10 – Robyn Hood #15
 2015/11 – Grimm Fairy Tales #116
 2015/11 – Coven #4 of 5
 2015/11 – Robyn Hood #16
 2015/11 – Grimm Tales of Terror: Vol 2 #1 of 13
 2015/11 – Grimm Tales of Terror: Vol 2 #2 of 13
 2015/11 – Wonderland #41
 2015/11 – Robyn Hood: 2015 Holiday Special
 2015/11 – Oz: Reign of the Witch Queen #6
 2015/12 – Realm Knights: 2015 Annual
 2015/12 – 10th Anniversary Special #6 – Van Helsing
 2015/12 – Robyn Hood #17
 2015/12 – Wonderland #42
 2015/12 – Coven #5 of 5
 2015/12 – Grimm Tales of Terror: Vol. 2 #3 of 13
 2015/12 – Van Helsing vs. Dracula #4 of 5
 2015/12 – Grimm Fairy Tales #117
 2015/12 – Realm Knights: 2015 Giant-Size

2016 
 2016/01 – Robyn Hood #18
 2016/01 – Inferno: Resurrection #1 of 5
 2016/01 – Grimm Fairy Tales #118
 2016/01 – Steampunk #1 of 2
 2016/01 – Wonderland #43
 2016/01 – Red Agent #1 of 5
 2016/01 – Grimm Tales of Terror: Vol. 2 #4 of 13
 2016/02 – Robyn Hood #19
 2016/02 – Grimm Fairy Tales #119
 2016/02 – Wonderland #44
 2016/02 – Oz: No Place Like Home [One-shot]
 2016/02 – Red Agent #2 of 5
 2016/03 – Grimm Tales of Terror Vol. 2 #5 of 13
 2016/03 – Van Helsing vs. Dracula #5 of 5
 2016/03 – Wonderland #45
 2016/03 – Grimm Fairy Tales #120
 2016/03 – Hellchild #1 of 5
 2016/03 – Robyn Hood #20
 2016/03 – Red Agent #3 of 5
 2016/03 – Grimm Tales of Terror Vol. 2 #6 of 13
 2016/04 – Inferno: Resurrection #2 of 5
 2016/04 – Steampunk #2 of 2
 2016/04 – Grimm Fairy Tales #121
 2016/04 – Wonderland #46
 2016/04 – Hellchild #2 of 5
 2016/04 – Red Agent #4 of 5
 2016/05 – Wonderland #47
 2016/05 – Grimm Tales of Terror Vol. 2 #7 of 13
 2016/05 – Grimm Tales of Terror Vol. 2 #8 of 13
 2016/05 – Grimm Fairy Tales #122
 2016/05 – Hellchild #3 of 5
 2016/05 – Inferno: Resurrection #3 of 5
 2016/05 – Robyn Hood: 2016 Annual
 2016/06 – Hellchild #4 of 5
 2016/06 – Death Force #1 of 6
 2016/06 – Wonderland #48
 2016/06 – Snow White vs. Snow White #1
 2016/06 – Inferno: Resurrection #4 of 5
 2016/06 – Red Agent #5 of 5
 2016/06 – Grimm Fairy Tales #123
 2016/06 – Death Force #2 of 6
 2016/07 – Grimm Fairy Tales #124
 2016/07 – Robyn Hood: I Love NY #1 of 12
 2016/07 – Grimm Tales of Terror Vol. 2 #10 of 13
 2016/07 – Wonderland #49
 2016/07 – Robyn Hood: I Love NY #2 of 12
 2016/07 – Death Force #3 of 6
 2016/07 – Hellchild #5 of 5
 2016/07 – Snow White vs. Snow White #2 of 2
 2016/07 – Grimm Fairy Tales: 2016 Swimsuit Special
 2016/08 – Death Force #4 of 6
 2016/08 – Van Helsing vs. Frankenstein #1
 2016/08 – Wonderland #50
 2016/08 – Robyn Hood: I Love NY #3 of 12
 2016/08 – Grimm Tales of Terror: Vol. 2 #11 of 13
 2016/08 – Grimm Fairy Tales #125
 2016/08 – Grimm Fairy Tales: Apocalypse #1
 2016/09 – Grimm Tales of Terror: Vol. 2 #12 of 13
 2016/09 – Van Helsing vs. Frankenstein #2
 2016/09 – Robyn Hood: I Love NY #4 of 12
 2016/09 – Wonderland: Finale
 2016/09 – Grimm Fairy Tales: Apocalypse #2
 2016/10 – Grimm Tales of Terror: Vol. 2 #13 of 13
 2016/10 – Grimm Fairy Tales: Genesis – Heroes Reborn
 2016/10 – Inferno: Resurrection #5 of 5
 2016/10 – Death Force #5 of 6
 2016/10 – Grimm Fairy Tales: 2016 Annual
 2016/10 – Robyn Hood: I Love NY #5 of 12
 2016/10 – Grimm Fairy Tales: 2016 Halloween Special
 2016/10 – Van Helsing vs. Frankenstein #3
 2016/10 – Grimm Fairy Tales: 2016 Photoshoot Edition
 2016/10 – Grimm Fairy Tales: Apocalypse #3
 2016/11 – Death Force #6 of 6
 2016/11 – Hellchild: The Unholy #1
 2016/11 – Robyn Hood: I Love NY #6 of 12
 2016/11 – Grimm Fairy Tales Genesis: Heroes Rising
 2016/11 – Red Agent: The Human Order #1
 2016/11 – Grimm Tales of Terror: 2016 Holiday Special
 2016/12 – Hellchild: The Unholy #2
 2016/12 – The Jungle Book: 2016 Holiday Special
 2016/12 – Van Helsing vs. Frankenstein #4
 2016/12 – Grimm Fairy Tales: Vol. 2 #1
 2016/12 – Cinderella: Serial Killer Princess #1
 2016/12 – Grimm Fairy Tales: Apocalypse #4
 2016/12 – Robyn Hood: I Love NY #7 of 12

2017 
 2017/01 – Grimm Tales of Terror, Vol. 3 #1
 2017/01 – Red Agent: The Human Order #2
 2017/01 – Grimm Fairy Tales: Vol. 2 #2
 2017/01 – Cinderella: Serial Killer Princess #2
 2017/01 – Robyn Hood: I Love NY #8 of 12
 2017/01 – Hellchild: The Unholy #3
 2017/02 – Van Helsing vs. Frankenstein #5
 2017/02 – Red Agent: The Human Order #3
 2017/02 – Grimm Tales of Terror, Vol. 3 #2
 2017/02 – Day of the Dead #1
 2017/02 – Van Helsing vs. The Mummy of Amun-Ra #1
 2017/02 – Grimm Fairy Tales Steampunk: Alice In Wonderland [One-Shot]
 2017/02 – Grimm Fairy Tales: Apocalypse #5
 2017/02 – Van Helsing vs. The Mummy of Amun-Ra #2
 2017/02 – Robyn Hood: I Love NY #9 of 12
 2017/03 – Grimm Fairy Tales: Vol. 2 #3
 2017/03 – Hellchild: The Unholy #4
 2017/03 – Red Agent: The Human Order #4
 2017/03 – Day of the Dead #2
 2017/03 – Cinderella: Serial Killer Princess #3
 2017/03 – Grimm Tales of Terror, Vol. 3 #3
 2017/03 – Van Helsing vs. The Mummy of Amun-Ra #3
 2017/03 – Robyn Hood: I Love NY #10 of 12
 2017/03 – Grimm Fairy Tales: Vol. 2 #4
 2017/03 – Red Agent: The Human Order #5
 2017/04 – Grimm Tales of Terror, Vol. 3 #4
 2017/04 – Cinderella: Serial Killer Princess #4
 2017/04 – Van Helsing vs. The Mummy of Amun-Ra #4
 2017/04 – Robyn Hood: I Love NY #11 of 12
 2017/04 – Grimm Fairy Tales: Vol. 2 #5
 2017/04 – Day of the Dead #3
 2017/04 – 2017 April Fools' Edition: Tales Of Terror
 2017/04 – Hellchild: The Unholy #5
 2017/05 – Red Agent: The Human Order #6
 2017/05 – Grimm Fairy Tales #0 Free Comic Book Day
 2017/05 – Day of the Dead #4
 2017/05 – Robyn Hood: I Love NY #12 of 12
 2017/05 – Red Agent: The Human Order #7
 2017/05 – Wonderland: Birth of Madness One-Shot
 2017/05 – Grimm Fairy Tales: Vol. 2 #6
 2017/05 – Grimm Tales of Terror: Vol. 3 #5
 2017/05 – Van Helsing vs. The Mummy of Amun-Ra #5
 2017/06 – Day of the Dead #5
 2017/06 – Grimm Tales of Terror: Vol. 3 #6
 2017/06 – Red Agent: The Human Order #8
 2017/06 – Robyn Hood: Tarot One-Shot
 2017/07 – Day of the Dead #6
 2017/07 – Van Helsing vs. The Mummy of Amun-Ra #6
 2017/07 – Grimm Fairy Tales: 2017 Swimsuit Special
 2017/07 – Grimm Fairy Tales: Vol. 2 #7
 2017/07 – Grimm Tales of Terror: Vol. 3 #7
 2017/07 – Van Helsing vs. The Werewolf #1
 2017/07 – Robyn Hood: The Hunt #1
 2017/08 – Red Agent: The Human Order #9
 2017/08 – Grimm Fairy Tales: Tarot #1
 2017/08 – Grimm Tales of Terror: Vol. 3 #8
 2017/08 – Grimm Fairy Tales: 2017 Armed Forces Edition
 2017/08 – Van Helsing vs. The Werewolf #2
 2017/08 – Grimm Fairy Tales: Vol. 2 #8
 2017/09 – Robyn Hood: The Hunt #2
 2017/09 – Van Helsing vs. The Werewolf #3
 2017/09 – Grimm Tales of Terror: Vol. 3 #9
 2017/10 – Robyn Hood: The Hunt #3
 2017/10 – Grimm Fairy Tales: Vol. 2 #9
 2017/10 – Grimm Fairy Tales: Tarot #2
 2017/10 – Van Helsing vs. The Werewolf #4
 2017/10 – Dance of The Dead #1
 2017/10 – Grimm Fairy Tales: 2017 Halloween Special
 2017/11 – Neverland Return of Hook (One Shot)
 2017/11 – Robyn Hood: The Hunt #4
 2017/11 – Grimm Fairy Tales: Vol. 2 #10
 2017/11 – Dance of The Dead #2
 2017/11 – Grimm Tales of Terror #10
 2017/11 – Van Helsing vs. The Werewolf #5
 2017/11 – Grimm Fairy Tales: Tarot #3
 2017/11 – Robyn Hood: The Hunt #5
 2017/12 – Van Helsing vs. The Werewolf #6
 2017/12 – Grimm Fairy Tales: 2017 Holiday Special
 2017/12 – Grimm Tales of Terror #11
 2017/12 – Robyn Hood: The Hunt #6

2018 
 2018/01 – Dance of The Dead #3
 2018/01 – Van Helsing vs. Robyn Hood #1
 2018/01 – Robyn Hood: The Curse #1
 2018/01 – Belle: Beast Hunter #1
 2018/01 – Grimm Fairy Tales: Vol. 2 #11
 2018/01 – Grimm Fairy Tales: Tarot #4
 2018/01 – Grimm Tales of Terror: Black & White Special Edition
 2018/02 – Robyn Hood: The Curse #2
 2018/02 – Grimm Tales of Terror Vol.3 #12
 2018/02 – Van Helsing vs. Robyn Hood #2
 2018/02 – Dance of The Dead #4
 2018/02 – Belle: Beast Hunter #2
 2018/02 – The Musketeers #1
 2018/02 – Grimm Fairy Tales Vol. 2 #12
 2018/02 – Grimm Tales of Terror Vol. 3 #13
 2018/03 – Van Helsing vs. Robyn Hood #3
 2018/03 – Hellchild: Inferno [One-shot]
 2018/03 – Grimm Fairy Tales: Vol. 2 #13
 2018/03 – Grimm Fairy Tales: Tarot #5
 2018/03 – The Musketeers #2
 2018/03 – Robyn Hood: The Curse #3
 2018/04 – Grimm Fairy Tales: Vol. 2 #14
 2018/04 – The Musketeers #3
 2018/04 – Belle: Beast Hunter #3
 2018/04 – Van Helsing vs. Robyn Hood #4
 2018/04 – Grimm Tales of Terror: Vol. 4 #1
 2018/04 – Robyn Hood: The Curse #4
 2018/04 – Dance of the Dead #5
 2018/05 – Jasmine: Crown of Kings #1
 2018/05 – Oz: The Wizard [One-shot]
 2018/05 – Grimm Tales of Terror: Vol. 4 #2
 2018/05 – Grimm Fairy Tales: Vol. 2 #15
 2018/05 – Grimm Tales of Terror: Vol. 4 #3
 2018/05 – The Musketeers #4
 2018/05 – Dance of the Dead #6
 2018/05 – Robyn Hood: The Curse #5
 2018/06 – Jasmine: Crown of Kings #2
 2018/06 – Grimm Fairy Tales: Tarot #6
 2018/06 – Grimm Fairy Tales: Vol. 2 #16
 2018/06 – Grimm Fairy Tales: Vol. 2 #17
 2018/06 – Grimm Tales of Terror: Vol. 4 #4
 2018/07 – Jasmine: Crown of Kings #3
 2018/07 – Robyn Hood: The Curse #6
 2018/07 – Grimm Fairy Tales: 2018 Cosplay Special
 2018/07 – The Musketeers #5
 2018/07 – Grimm Tales of Terror: Vol. 4 #5
 2018/07 – Revenge of Wonderland #1
 2018/07 – Grimm Fairy Tales: Vol. 2 #18
 2018/08 – Belle: Beast Hunter #4
 2018/08 – Jasmine: Crown of Kings #4
 2018/08 – Revenge of Wonderland #2
 2018/08 – Grimm Fairy Tales: Vol. 2 #19
 2018/09 – Jasmine: Crown of Kings #5
 2018/09 – Grimm Tales of Terror: Vol. 4 #6
 2018/09 – Grimm Tales of Terror: 2018 Halloween Special
 2018/09 – Revenge of Wonderland #3
 2018/09 – Grimm Tales of Terror: Vol. 4 #7
 2018/09 – Grimm Fairy Tales: Vol. 2 #20
 2018/09 – Grimm Fairy Tales: Vol. 2 #21
 2018/09 – The Black Knight #1
 2018/10 – Grimm Fairy Tales: Vol. 2 #22
 2018/10 – Belle: Beast Hunter #5
 2018/10 – Revenge of Wonderland #4
 2018/10 – Grimm Tales of Terror: Vol. 4 #8
 2018/11 – Grimm Fairy Tales: Vol. 2 #23
 2018/11 – Van Helsing: Sword of Heaven #1
 2018/11 – Grimm Tales of Terror Vol. 4 #9
 2018/11 – Revenge of Wonderland #5
 2018/12 – Grimm Fairy Tales: Vol. 2 #24
 2018/12 – The Black Knight #2
 2018/12 – Van Helsing: Sword of Heaven #2
 2018/12 – Grimm Fairy Tales: 2018 Holiday Special
 2018/12 – Belle: Beast Hunter #6
 2018/12 – Grimm Tales of Terror Vol. 4 #10

2019 

 2019/01 – Revenge of Wonderland #6
 2019/01 – The Black Knight #3
 2019/01 – Van Helsing: Sword of Heaven #3
 2019/01 – Grimm Fairy Tales: Vol. 2 #25
 2019/01 – Grimm Tales of Terror Vol. 4 #11
 2019/01 – Grimm Fairy Tales: 2019 Annual
 2019/01 – The Black Knight #4
 2019/01 – Grimm Universe Presents 2019
 2019/02 – Van Helsing: Sword of Heaven #4
 2019/02 – Grimm Tales of Terror Vol. 4 #12
 2019/02 – Robyn Hood: Outlaw #1
 2019/02 – Zodiac #1
 2019/02 – Grimm Fairy Tales: 2019 Giant Size
 2019/03 – Van Helsing: Sword of Heaven #5
 2019/03 – Robyn Hood: Outlaw #2
 2019/03 – Grimm Tales of Terror Vol. 4 #13
 2019/03 – The Black Knight #5
 2019/03 – Gretel #1
 2019/03 – Grimm Fairy Tales, Vol. 2 #26
 2019/03 – Zodiac #2
 2019/04 – Van Helsing: Sword of Heaven #6
 2019/04 – Hellchild: Blood Money #1
 2019/04 – Robyn Hood: Outlaw #3
 2019/04 – Oz: Heart of Magic #1
 2019/04 – Gretel #2
 2019/04 – Grimm Fairy Tales, Vol. 2 #27
 2019/04 – Zodiac #3
 2019/05 – Dragonsblood #1
 2019/05 – Hellchild: Blood Money #2
 2019/05 – Robyn Hood: Outlaw #4
 2019/05 – Oz: Heart of Magic #2
 2019/05 – Gretel #3
 2019/05 – Grimm Fairy Tales, Vol. 2 #28
 2019/06 – Dragonsblood #2
 2019/06 – Hellchild: Blood Money #3
 2019/06 – Robyn Hood: Outlaw #5
 2019/06 – Gretel #4
 2019/06 – Grimm Fairy Tales, Vol. 2 #29
 2019/06 – Oz: Heart of Magic #3
 2019/07 – Dragonsblood #3
 2019/07 – Grimm Fairy Tales: 2019 Swimsuit Special
 2019/07 – Belle: Oath of Thorns #1
 2019/07 – Gretel #5
 2019/07 – Robyn Hood: Outlaw #6
 2019/07 – Hellchild: Blood Money #4
 2019/07 – Oz: Heart of Magic #4
 2019/08 – Dragonsblood #4
 2019/08 – Grimm Fairy Tales, Vol. 2 #30
 2019/08 – Van Helsing vs. Dracula's Daughter #1
 2019/08 – Grimm Universe Presents: Fall 2019
 2019/09 – Oz Heart of Magic #5
 2019/09 – Mystere #1
 2019/09 – Belle Oath of Thorns #2
 2019/09 – Van Helsing vs. Dracula's Daughter #2
 2019/09 – Grimm Tales of Terror Presents The Bridgewater Triangle
 2019/09 – Grimm Fairy Tales, Vol. 2 #31
 2019/10 – Mystere #2
 2019/10 – Grimm Fairy Tales, Vol. 2 #32
 2019/10 – Grimm Tales of Terror 2019 Halloween Special 
 2019/10 – Van Helsing vs. Dracula's Daughter #3
 2019/10 – Grimm Tales of Terror #2: The Bridgewater Triangle 
 2019/11 – Grimm Fairy Tales: 2019 Holiday Special
 2019/11 – Mystere #3
 2019/11 – Robyn Hood: Vigilante #1
 2019/11 – Grimm Fairy Tales: 2019 Armed Forces Edition
 2019/11 – Van Helsing vs. Dracula's Daughter #4
 2019/12 – Grimm Fairy Tales, Vol. 2 #33
 2019/12 – Mystere #4: Revelations and Resurrections
 2019/12 – Belle #3: Oath of Thorns
 2019/12 – Robyn Hood: Vigilante #2
 2019/12 – Grimm Tales of Terror #3: The Bridgewater Triangle

2020 

 2020/01 – Grimm Fairy Tales, Vol. 2 #34
 2020/01 – Van Helsing vs. Dracula's Daughter #5
 2020/01 – Red Agent: Island of Dr Moreau #1
 2020/01 – Mystere #5: Black Friday 
 2020/01 – Robyn Hood: Vigilante #3
 2020/01 – Belle: Oath of Thorns #4
 2020/02 – Red Agent: Island of Dr Moreau #2
 2020/02 – Robyn Hood: Vigilante #4
 2020/02 – Grimm Fairy Tales, Vol. 2 #35
 2020/02 – Belle: Oath of Thorns #5
 2020/02 – Van Helsing vs. The League of Monsters #1
 2020/02 – Grimm Universe Presents 2020
 2020/02 – Grimm Fairy Tales, Vol. 2 #36
 2020/03 – Red Agent: Island of Dr Moreau #3
 2020/03 – Robyn Hood: Vigilante #5
 2020/03 – Shang #1
 2020/03 – Van Helsing vs. The League of Monsters #2
 2020/04 – Red Agent: Island of Dr Moreau #4
 2020/04 – Belle: Oath of Thorns #6
 2020/04 – Grimm Fairy Tales, Vol. 2 #37
 2020/04 – Robyn Hood: Vigilante #6
 2020/04 – Grimm Fairy Tales: Jasco One-Shot #1
 2020/06 – Grimm Fairy Tales: 2020 Annual
 2020/06 – Red Agent: Island of Dr Moreau #5
 2020/07 – Belle vs. The Black Knight One-Shot #1
 2020/07 – Van Helsing vs. The League of Monsters #3
 2020/07 – Grimm Fairy Tales, Vol. 2 #38
 2020/07 – Shang #2
 2020/07 – Grimm Fairy Tales, Vol. 2 #39
 2020/07 – Robyn Hood: Justice #1
 2020/08 – Robyn Hood: Justice #2
 2020/08 – Shang #3
 2020/08 – Grimm Fairy Tales, Vol. 2 #40
 2020/08 – Van Helsing vs. The League of Monsters #4
 2020/09 – Belle: Ghosts and Goblins One-Shot
 2020/09 – Robyn Hood: Justice #3
 2020/09 – Belle: Hearts and Minds One-Shot
 2020/09 – Van Helsing vs. The League of Monsters #5
 2020/09 – Grimm Tales of Terror Quarterly: Hellfire
 2020/10 – Robyn Hood: Justice #4
 2020/10 – Grimm Fairy Tales, Vol. 2 #41
 2020/10 – Grimm Myths and Legends Quarterly: Ares
 2020/10 – Grimm Tales of Terror Quarterly: 2020 Halloween Special
 2020/10 – Van Helsing vs. The League of Monsters #6
 2020/11 – Grimm Fairy Tales: 2020 Holiday Pinup Special
 2020/11 – Grimm Fairy Tales, Vol. 2 #42
 2020/11 – Belle: Horns of the Minotaur
 2020/11 – Van Helsing Annual: Bloodlust
 2020/11 – Robyn Hood: Justice #5
 2020/11 – Belle: Targeted Prey One-Shot
 2020/12 – Grimm Fairy Tales: 2020 Holiday Special
 2020/12 – Robyn Hood: Justice #6
 2020/12 – Grimm Fairy Tales, Vol. 2 #43
 2020/12 – Cinderella Annual: Bloody Xmas
 2020/12 – Robyn Hood Annual: Worlds Apart

2021 
 2021/01 – Van Helsing #50
 2021/01 – Robyn Hood: Iron Maiden
 2021/01 – Belle: Dead of Winter
 2021/01 – Van Helsing: Hellfire
 2021/01 – Grimm Myths & Legends: Gretel Witch Hunter
 2021/02 – Grimm Fairy Tales, Vol. 2 #44
 2021/02 – Grimm Spotlight: Black Knight vs. Lord of the Flies
 2021/02 – Grimm Universe Presents Quarterly: Darkwatchers feat. Gretel
 2021/02 – Grimm Fairy Tales, Vol. 2 #45
 2021/02 – Robyn Hood: Iron Maiden #2
 2021/03 – Grimm Myths & Legends: Dark Princess
 2021/03 – Grimm Fairy Tales, Vol. 2 #46
 2021/03 – Robyn Hood: Cult of the Spider Queen
 2021/03 – Belle: Thunder of Gods
 2021/03 – Van Helsing: Black Annis
 2021/03 – Grimm Fairy Tales, Vol. 2 #47
 2021/04 – Grimm Tales of Terror Quarterly: HH Holmes
 2021/04 – Grimm Spotlight: Mystere - Voodoo Dawn
 2021/04 – Belle: King of Serpents
 2021/04 – Grimm Universe Presents Quarterly: Steampunk 
 2021/05 – Van Helsing: Steampunk
 2021/05 – Grimm Fairy Tales, Vol. 2 #48
 2021/05 – Robyn Hood: Voodoo Dawn
 2021/05 – Neverland 2021 Annual
 2021/06 – Grimm Myths & Legends: Dragon Clan
 2021/06 – Grimm Spotlight - Hercules Payne vs. The Scorpion Queen
 2021/06 – Belle: Sirens
 2021/06 – Grimm Fairy Tales, Vol. 2 #49
 2021/06 – Oz Annual: Patchwork Girl
 2021/07 – Grimm Fairy Tales, Vol. 2 #50
 2021/07 – Robyn Hood: Goldilocks
 2021/07 – Grimm Tales of Terror Quarterly: Game Night
 2021/07 – Grimm Fairy Tales: 2021 Swimsuit Special
 2021/08 – Van Helsing: The Invisible Woman
 2021/08 – Grimm Universe Presents Quarterly : Zodiac vs Death Force
 2021/08 – Belle: Dragon Clan
 2021/08 – Grimm Spotlight: Red Agent: Beast of Belgium
 2021/09 – Robyn Hood Annual: The Swarm
 2021/09 – Grimm Fairy Tales, Vol. 2 #51
 2021/09 – Wonderland Annual: Reign of Madness
 2021/09 – Grimm Fairy Tales, Vol. 2 #52
 2021/09 – Robyn Hood: Night of the Hunter
 2021/10 – Van Helsing: Beast of Exmoor
 2021/10 – Belle: Headless Horseman
 2021/10 – Grimm Tales of Terror Quarterly: 2021 Halloween Special
 2021/10 – Grimm Spotlight: Cinderella vs. Zombies
 2021/10 – Grimm Fairy Tales, Vol. 2 #53
 2021/11 – Van Helsing: Return of The League of Monsters, Part 1
 2021/11 – Grimm Tales of Terror Quarterly: Bachelorette Party
 2021/11 – Grimm Tales of Terror Annual: Goddess of Death
 2021/11 – Grimm Fairy Tales, Vol. 2 #54
 2021/12 – Myths and Legends Quarterly - Blood Pharaoh
 2021/12 – Grimm Myths and Legends Quarterly - Prophecy
 2021/12 – Grimm Universe Presents Quarterly: 2021 Holiday Special
 2021/12 – Robyn Hood: Hellfire
 2021/12 – Belle: Kill Zone
 2021/12 – Grimm Fairy Tales, Vol. 2 #55

2022 
2022/01 – Grimm Spotlight: Hellchild
2022/01 – Robyn Hood: Home Sweet Home
2022/01 – Van Helsing: Return of the League of Monsters, Part 2
2022/01 – Grimm Fairy Tales, Vol. 2 #56
2022/02 – Belle #25
2022/02 – Grimm Spotlight: Gretel: Bloody Mary
2022/02 – Grimm Universe Presents Quarterly: The Black Knight
2022/02 – Belle: Queen of Serpents
2022/02 – Grimm Fairy Tales, Vol. 2 #57
2022/03 – Robyn Hood: Shadows of the Past
2022/03 – Myths & Legends Quarterly: Jack & Jill
2022/03 – Grimm Fairy Tales, Vol. 2 #58
2022/04 – Grimm Spotlight: Mystere - Divinity
2022/04 – Belle: War of the Giants
2022/04 – Van Helsing Annual: Hour of the Witch
2022/04 – Van Helsing: Shattered Soul
2022/04 – Grimm Tales of Terror Quarterly: Sea of Souls
2022/04 – Grimm Universe Presents Quarterly: Dracula's Daughter
2022/04 – Oz Annual: Dominion of Ozmo
2022/04 – Grimm Fairy Tales, Vol. 2 #59
2022/05 – Grimm Fairy Tales 2022 May the 4th Cosplay Special
2022/05 – Robyn Hood: Hearts of Darkness
2022/05 – Belle: Labyrinth
2022/05 – Myths & Legends Quarterly: Jasmine
2022/05 – Van Helsing: Bloodborne
2022/05 – Grimm Fairy Tales, Vol. 2 #60
2022/06 – Grimm Spotlight: Zodiac
2022/06 – Grimm Fairy Tales 2022 Swimsuit Special
2022/06 – Robyn Hood Annual: Children of Darkness
2022/06 – Grimm Tales of Terror Quarterly: Back to School
2022/06 – Grimm Fairy Tales, Vol. 2 #61
2022/07 – Van Helsing: From the Depths
2022/07 – Robyn Hood: The Children of Dr. Moreau
2022/07 – Belle: Return of Scylla
2022/08 – Grimm Spotlight: Iron Maiden
2022/08 – Grimm Fairy Tales, Vol. 2 #62
2022/08 – Grimm Universe Presents Quarterly: Sleeping Beauty
2022/08 – Grimm Fairy Tales: 2022 Annual
2022/08 – Myths & Legends Quarterly: Wonderland - War of Madness
2022/08 – Grimm Fairy Tales, Vol. 2 #63
2022/09 – Robyn Hood: Baba Yaga
2022/09 – Van Helsing: Flesh of My Blood
2022/09 – Belle: Hunt of the Centaurs
2022/09 – Grimm Fairy Tales, Vol. 2 #64
2022/10 – Grimm Tales of Terror Quarterly: Rise of Cthulhu
2022/10 – Grimm Fairy Tales 2022 Horror Pinup Special
2022/10 – Grimm Universe Presents Quarterly: 2022 Halloween Special
2022/10 – Grimm Spotlight: Cinderella vs. The Tooth Fairy
2022/10 – Grimm Fairy Tales, Vol. 2 #65
2022/11 – Oz: Return of the Wicked Witch #1
2022/11 – Grimm Fairy Tales 2022 Holiday Pinup Special
2022/11 – Belle Annual: Depths of Tartarus
2022/11 – Van Helsing: Rites of Shadows
2022/11 – Robyn Hood: Last Stop
2022/11 – Grimm Fairy Tales, Vol. 2 #66
2022/12 – Belle: Deep Freeze
2022/12 – Grimm Spotlight: Red Agent - Friendly Fire
2022/12 – Grimm Tales of Terror Quarterly: 2022 Holiday Special
2022/12 – Grimm Myths & Legends Quarterly: Blood of the Gods
2022/12 – Oz: Return of the Wicked Witch #2
2022/12 – Grimm Fairy Tales, Vol. 2 #67

2023 
2023/01 – Robyn Hood: Dagon
2023/01 – Belle: Scream of the Banshee
2023/01 – Wonderland Annual: It's a Wonderful Life
2023/01 – Grimm Fairy Tales Vol. 2, #68
2023/02 – Phoenix Files #1
2023/02 – Grimm Spotlight: Inferno - The Soul Collector
2023/02 – Grimm Tales of Terror Quarterly: 2023 Valentine's Day Special
2023/02 – Van Helsing: Deadly Alchemy
2023/02 – Grimm Universe Presents Quarterly: Cinderella - Fairy World Massacre
2023/02 – Grimm Fairy Tales Vol. 2, #69
2023/03 – Oz: Return of the Wicked Witch #3
2023/03 – Gretel: Seeds of Despair
2023/03 – Van Helsing Annual: Sins of the Father

Notes

References

External links
 

2005 comics debuts
Comics based on Alice in Wonderland
Comics based on fairy tales
Horror comics